The Canon EOS D2000 (a Canon branded Kodak DCS 520) is a 2-megapixel digital single-lens reflex camera developed by Kodak on a Canon EOS-1N body.  It was released in March 1998.  It features a CCD sensor and can shoot at 3.5 frames per second. Many enthusiasts regard the D2000 as Canon's first truly usable Digital SLR. It was released in tandem with the Canon EOS D6000 (a rebranded Kodak DCS 560), a 6-megapixel model.

Like its predecessor, the EOS DCS 3, the D2000 uses an EOS-1 N camera body with a Kodak digital back. However, the digital back was completely redesigned, being better integrated into the body, using a higher-resolution APS-C sized sensor, adding a second PCMCIA card slot, replacing the SCSI interface with an IEEE 1394 interface, and adding a color screen for viewing images that had been taken, a feature that was lacking from the DCS 3 and the higher-end DCS 1. Other incremental improvements such as a higher shooting rate and a swappable, rechargeable battery pack were included.

The D2000 was the last of the Kodak / Canon press cameras. It was sold by Kodak until at least as late as 2001. Canon's first home-grown professional digital SLR, the Canon EOS-1D, was released later the same year.

See also
Canon EOS
Canon EF lens mount
Kodak DCS

References

External links
 Canon Camera Museum: EOS D2000

D2000
Products introduced in 1998